Leonhard Beck (c. 1480 – 1542) was a painter and designer of woodcuts in Augsburg, Germany. He was the son of Georg Beck, who was active as a miniaturist in Augsburg c. 1490-1512/15. He worked with his father on two Psalters for the Augsburg monastery in 1495.  He was an assistant to Hans Holbein the Elder, working on a Holbein altarpiece now in the Städel in Frankfurt am Main in 1500-1501.

His most notable work came when he joined the stable of artists, most in Augsburg, used by Emperor Maximilian I for his series of self-propagandising projects in or with woodcut. He was the main designer for the heavily illustrated poem Theuerdank (1517), producing 77 of the 118 woodcuts, and apparently all the many adjustments Maximilian required for the second edition in 1519. In these, his style often contrasts painfully with those of the better artists whose work he was altering. He designed 126 blocks for Der Weisskunig and 7 for the Triumphal Procession. He painted and drew a number of portraits, and designed woodcuts, mostly for book illustrations.

Beck is also known for a compilation of 123 woodcuts, all by him, entitled the Genealogy of the House of Habsburg (or in French Images de Saints et Saintes issus de la famille de l'empereur Maximilien I). The work was commissioned by Maximilian I, intended to show saintly members of his family. Some of the images show saints connected to the Abbey of Maubeuge, which apparently received a copy of the set.

References

External links

1480 births
1542 deaths
Artists from Augsburg
German draughtsmen
German printmakers
16th-century German painters
German male painters
German Renaissance painters